The National Loktantrik Party (National Democratic Party), is a defunct political party in India. It was working amongst the Muslim minority community since its foundation on 15 December 1995 by Dr. Masood Ahmad. Party had an MP in Lok Sabha named Baleshwar Yadav from Padrauna Lok Sabha in 14th Lok Sabha. Party stopped fighting elections after Founder President Masood Ahmad joined Rashtriya Lok Dal in August 2016.

References

Political parties in India